Moud (Persian: مود, also Romanized as Mūd and Mud and Mood; also known as Mood Nahar Khan and Mūd-e Dahanāb) is a city and capital of Mud District, in Sarbisheh County, South Khorasan Province, Iran. Formerly up to the division of the Province from Khorasan it was a borough of today South Khorasan's provincial capital Birjand. At the 2006 census, its population was 2,451, in 695 families.

Archaeologists excavating in the southern historical town of Moud in South Khorasan province have unearthed ancient earthenware dating back to the Parthian dynastic era (248 BCE-224 CE).
Excavations were conducted on an ancient mound located near the city of Birjand. Numerous historical artifacts dating back from the pre-historic eras up to the Safavid dynasty were found at the site.

The last prince of Birjand was Shah Seyyed Ali Kazemi who came from Moud (where most people were related with him), a relative of the emperor Shah Reza Pahlavi and the Prime minister Asadollah Alam.

The area is known for Moud blankets and carpets that have normally a curvilinear design with a sun flower shaped picture in the center. The production of such carpets is usually high-quality. These carpets are made of wool or cotton. They attained their valuation by the decree of the Persian Safavid emperor Shah Abbas I, who not only arranged the building of the fortresses in this region, but also retained the original Persian design styles and knot techniques.

Notables from Mud

Shah Seyyed Ali Kazemi (born in Mud, †1984 in Birjand), last tribal leader of Muod and Birjand at the beginning of the Pahlavi Dynasty 
Kazem Motamadnedjad (born in Mud), communication scientist 
Mahdi Balali-Mood (born in Mud), Medical Toxicologist
Marcel Kasemi, crown prince

References

External links

 http://moodcity.ir - Moodcity News Web
General touristic Information centers

Populated places in Sarbisheh County

Cities in South Khorasan Province